Elaine Elizabeth Darling (née Melloy; 6 June 1936 – 30 August 2019) was an Australian politician. The Labor member for Lilley from 1980 to 1993, she was the first woman from Queensland to be elected to the House of Representatives.

Early life
Born in Brisbane, she attended the University of Queensland before becoming a teacher, eventually rising to be an assistant to the director of the Brisbane Kindergarten Training College.

Politics
In 1980, she was elected to the Australian House of Representatives as the Labor Party member for Lilley, defeating the sitting Liberal Party MP Kevin Cairns. She was the fifth woman elected to the House of Representatives, and the second female Labor member of that house (the first was Joan Child). She held Lilley until her retirement in 1993.

From 2000 to 2004, she was a council member of the City of Caloundra.

Family political connections 
Her father, Jack Melloy, was a long serving member of the Australian Labor Party and member of the Legislative Assembly of Queensland. Her daughter, Vicky Darling, was a member of the Legislative Assembly of Queensland from 2006 to 2012.

References

1936 births
2019 deaths
Australian Labor Party members of the Parliament of Australia
Members of the Australian House of Representatives for Lilley
Members of the Australian House of Representatives
Women members of the Australian House of Representatives
Queensland local councillors
20th-century Australian politicians
Women local councillors in Australia
20th-century Australian women politicians